Fort Mason Tunnel is an abandoned single-track railway tunnel in San Francisco which runs under a small hill upon which sits a portion of the old Fort Mason. The tunnel was constructed in 1913 and opened to rail traffic in 1914. The east portal is near the north end of Van Ness Avenue; the west portal feeds onto Marina Boulevard at Laguna Street.

History 
The tunnel's construction served several purposes. The rail link supplied goods and mass transit to the Panama Pacific International Exposition the following year; the U.S. Army utilized the line for construction of the port of embarkation at Fort Mason. The tunnel operated as part of the State Belt Railroad until the route's suspension in 1993.

Future 

In 2012, the National Park Service released a final environmental impact report on providing extended service through the tunnel to the San Francisco Municipal Railway F Market & Wharves line. The cost of refurbishment and extension of the rail line was estimated at $60 million in 2017.

References 

Railroad tunnels in California
Tunnels in San Francisco
Fisherman's Wharf, San Francisco
Golden Gate National Recreation Area
Tunnels completed in 1914
1914 establishments in California
Muni Metro
Proposed public transportation in the San Francisco Bay Area
Proposed railway lines in California
Proposed railway tunnels in North America